"She's Lost Control" is a song by British post-punk band Joy Division. Released on their 1979 debut album, Unknown Pleasures, "She's Lost Control" was first performed live by the band in June 1978 and draws primary lyrical inspiration from a young woman experiencing a violent epileptic  seizure.

Two separate recordings of the song have been released: the version appearing on the band's debut album, and an extended, more electronic version released in 1980 as a 12" single. This 12" single version contains an additional verse not present on the initial version of the song, and was recorded in March 1980 at Strawberry Studios, Stockport, making this song one of the last studio recordings recorded by the band prior to the May 1980 suicide of their lead singer, Ian Curtis. On the US release of the 12" single, "She's Lost Control" appeared as the A-side (with "Atmosphere" as the B-side), as opposed the UK version, where the song appeared as the B-side to "Atmosphere".

Lyrical inspiration
Curtis primarily drew the lyrical inspiration for "She's Lost Control" from a young woman with whom he had become acquainted through his employment as an Assistant Disablement Resettlement Officer at a Macclesfield occupational rehabilitation centre between 1978 and 1979. The woman had epilepsy and had been desperate to find employment, yet she suffered seizures whenever she came to the exchange, which would greatly disturb Curtis, who himself suffered from epilepsy. At one stage, this young woman ceased attending her appointments at the occupational rehabilitation centre. Initially, Curtis assumed she had found a job, but he would later discover she had died of an epileptic seizure.

The woman's unexpected death and Curtis' subsequent awareness and experiences of the stigma endured by individuals suffering from neurological impairments formed the lyrical inspiration for the song.

The hand-written lyrics were included in the new British Pop Archive, housed in Manchester's John Rylands Library, in 2022.

Composition
The composition of "She's Lost Control" centres upon Peter Hook's bassline, played high up on the neck, and a mechanistic drum beat played by Stephen Morris. For the song's recording, each drum was recorded completely separately, as producer Martin Hannett obsessively pursued clean drum sounds with no "bleed through" (when one drum's sound is added to the signal of another drum unintentionally) on songs he considered potential singles.

Live, this song would be played at a faster pace than that upon the album, and much more aggressively, with Curtis often shouting the lyrics before the bridge sections. The syndrum used upon live performances of this song would often be more abrasive and louder in the mix than that used upon the studio recordings. On later live recordings, Curtis would play a keyboard line during the coda, one of only a few songs on which he would play an instrument.

Live versions
A number of live versions of the song appear on re-issues of the band's albums. In addition, the 2008 compilation release, The Best of Joy Division, includes the Peel session the band had recorded of this song in January 1979.

Cover versions
Many indie bands and artists have since covered "She's Lost Control". These artists include Girls Against Boys, Siobhan Fahey, Grace Jones and Spoek Mathambo. The guitar riff for "She's Lost Control" was also sampled in 1993 by the Manchester electronic music group 808 State for their single "Contrique".

In popular culture
A very loose cover version of the song, recorded by the Greek minimal wave band Alive She Died, featured prominently in a 2015 advertising campaign for the cruise/resort collection of the Italian fashion house, Gucci.

The 2002 film 24 Hour Party People includes a scene dramatizing the recording of the song, and suggests that Morris recorded the drum beat on the roof of the studio, as well as continuing to play the beat long after the other band members had left the studio.

The name of the song is referenced in the title of the 2007 Ian Curtis biopic Control, which includes the incident which inspired the song, and also the actual recording of the song. This later scene depicts drummer Stephen Morris using an aerosol can sprayed into a microphone as percussion.

Track listing

Notes

References

Further reading

Unknown Pleasures: Inside Joy Division. Peter Hook (2012). 
Shakin' All Over: Popular Music and Disability. George McKay (2013) 
Touching From a Distance:Ian Curtis and Joy Division. Deborah Curtis (2005).

External links
 2018 Radio X review of "She's Lost Control"
 BBC Arts archive performance of "She's Lost Control", originally broadcast 15 September 1979
Official Joy Division website
 "She's Lost Control", reviewed at AllMusic by Ned Raggett

1979 songs
1980 singles
Joy Division songs
Songs about death
Songs about suicide
Songs inspired by deaths
Song recordings produced by Martin Hannett
Songs written by Bernard Sumner
Songs written by Ian Curtis
Songs written by Peter Hook
Songs written by Stephen Morris (musician)
Songs about diseases and disorders